The 1971–72 FA Trophy was the third season of the FA Trophy.

First qualifying round

Ties

Replays

2nd replay

Second qualifying round

Ties

Replays

Third qualifying round

Ties

Replays

2nd replays

1st round
The teams that given byes to this round are Telford United, Macclesfield Town, Bradford Park Avenue, Hillingdon Borough, Wimbledon, Worcester City, Romford, Weymouth, Yeovil Town, Wigan Athletic, South Shields, Bangor City, Mossley, Kidderminster Harriers, Bromsgrove Rovers, Bridgwater Town, Burscough, Chelmsford City, Barnet, Hereford United, Kettering Town, Grantham, Buxton, Burton Albion, Bedford Town, Dover, Scarborough, Northwich Victoria, Matlock Town, Tamworth, Hastings United and Stourbridge.

Ties

Replays

2nd replays

2nd round

Ties

Replays

3rd round

Ties

Replay

4th round

Ties

Replays

Semi finals

Ties

Final

External links
 Football Club History Database: FA Trophy 1971–72

1971–72 domestic association football cups
1971–72 in English football
1971-72